Leesburg is a town in Cherokee County, Alabama, United States. At the 2020 census, the population was 911.

History
Leesburg was originally called Hamptonville; it was named for Joseph Hampton and the Henslee family respectively. A post office was established as Hamptonville in 1836, and in 1839 the name was changed to Leesburg.

Geography
Leesburg is located in western Cherokee County at 34°10'57.446" North, 85°46'8.350" West (34.182624, -85.768986). It is bordered by Lookout Mountain and the town of Sand Rock to the north and Weiss Lake on the Coosa River to the south. Weiss Dam, forming the lake, is located just south of the town limits.

U.S. Route 411 runs through the town from west to east, leading southeast 5 mi (8 km) to Centre, the county seat of Cherokee County, and southwest 19 mi (31 km) to Gadsden. Alabama State Route 68 meets US-411 in town, leading north 5 mi (8 km) to Sand Rock, and following US-411 east to Centre.

Demographics

2020 census

As of the 2020 United States census, there were 911 people, 381 households, and 292 families residing in the town.

2010 census
As of the census of 2010, there were 1,027 people, 409 households, and 298 families residing in the town. The racial makeup of the town was 96.5% White, 0.0% Native American, 0.0% Asian, 0.5% from other races, and 1.9% from two or more races. 1.3% of the population were Hispanic or Latino of any race.

There were 409 households, out of which 29.1% had children under the age of 18 living with them, 55.3% were married couples living together, 11.0% had a female householder with no husband present, and 27.1% were non-families. 22.0% of all households were made up of individuals, and 9.3% had someone living alone who was 65 years of age or older. The average household size was 2.51 and the average family size was 2.90.

In the town, the population was spread out, with 23.5% under the age of 18, 8.9% from 18 to 24, 25.1% from 25 to 44, 29.4% from 45 to 64, and 13.1% who were 65 years of age or older. The median age was 40.4 years. For every 100 females, there were 103.4 males. For every 100 females age 18 and over, there were 102.8 males.

The median income for a household in the town was $36,806, and the median income for a family was $45,714. Males had a median income of $32,075 versus $26,793 for females. The per capita income for the town was $18,392. About 12.5% of families and 15.6% of the population were below the poverty line, including 18.2% of those under age 18 and 12.2% of those age 65 or over.

Government 
The town of Leesburg operates a Mayor–council government, composed of Mayor Brandy Pierce and 5 town council members. Place #1 is held by Councilman Frankie Brewster, Place #2 is held by Councilman Joe Sonaty, Place #3 is held by Councilman Jimmy Tillery, Place #4 is held by Councilman Wayne Byram, and Place #5 is held by Councilwoman Melissa Rodriguez.

Climate
Climate is characterized by relatively high temperatures and evenly distributed precipitation throughout the year.  The Köppen Climate Classification subtype for this climate is "Cfa" (Humid Subtropical Climate).

Notable person
 Lindy Hood, college basketball All-American center for Alabama

References

External links
Town of Leesburg official website

Towns in Alabama
Towns in Cherokee County, Alabama